The Older Parian Group is a geologic group in Trinidad and Tobago. The bituminous limestone preserves fossils of Didymotis trinidadensis dating back to the Aptian period.

See also 
 List of fossiliferous stratigraphic units in Trinidad and Tobago

References

Further reading 
 
 
 L. Sommermeier. 1918. Über einen Fossilfund aus der Unteren Kreide von Trinidad. Centralblatt für Mineralogie, Geologie und Paläontologie 1918:131-136

Geologic groups of South America
Geologic formations of Trinidad and Tobago
Cretaceous Trinidad and Tobago
Aptian Stage
Limestone formations
Source rock formations